Cephas Lemba (born 21 May 1970) is a Zambian sprinter. He competed in the men's 400 metres at the 1992 Summer Olympics.

References

1970 births
Living people
Athletes (track and field) at the 1992 Summer Olympics
Zambian male sprinters
Olympic athletes of Zambia
Place of birth missing (living people)